Rock mechanics is a theoretical and applied science of the mechanical behavior of rocks and rock masses. Compared to geology, it is the branch of mechanics concerned with the response of rock and rock masses to the force fields of their physical environment.

Background
Rock mechanics forms part of the much broader subject of geomechanics, which is concerned with the mechanical responses of all geological materials, including soils. Rock mechanics, as applied in engineering geology, mining, petroleum, and civil engineering practices, among many others. It is concerned with the application of the principles of engineering mechanics to the design of the rock structures generated by processes such as mining, drilling, reservoir production, or civil construction activity such as tunnels, mining shafts, underground excavations, open pit mines, oil and gas wells, geothermal energy systems, road cuts, waste repositories, and other structures built in or of rock. Rock mechanics answers questions like, is reinforcement necessary for a rock or will it be able to handle whatever load it is faced with?  It also includes the design of reinforcement systems, such as rock bolting patterns.

Rock mechanics is a theoretical and applied science of the mechanical behavior of rocks and rock masses; it is a branch of mechanics concerned with the response of rock and rock masses to the force fields of their physical environment. Rock mechanics is concerned with the application of the principles of engineering mechanics to the design of structures built in or on rock. The structure could include many things, such as; a drill hole, a mining shaft, a tunnel, a reservoir dam, a repository component, or a building. Rock mechanics is used in many engineering disciplines, but primarily used in Mining, Civil, Geotechnical, Transportation, and Petroleum Engineering.

Methods 
Testing the properties of a rock is essential to understand how stable or unstable it is. Rock mechanics involves 3 categories of testing methods; tests on intact rocks, discontinuities, and rock masses.

Two direct methods of testing that can be done are laboratory tests and in-situ tests. There are also indirect methods of testing which involve correlations and estimations that are obtained by analyzing field observations. The data these testing methods provide are crucial for the design, structure and research of rock mechanics and rock engineering. 

Intact rocks and discontinuities can be tested in the laboratory through running small-scale experiments to gather empirical data, however rock masses require some larger-scale field measurements rather than laboratory work due to their more complex nature.

Laboratory tests provide both classification and characterization of the rock as well as a determination of what rock properties will be used in the engineering design. Examples of some of these laboratory tests include; sound velocity tests, hardness tests, creep tests, and tensile strength tests. In-situ tests, which is when the rock being studied is subjected to a heavy load and then being watched to see if it deforms, provides an insight into what impacts a rock masses' strength and stability.

Understanding the strength of a rock mass is difficult but necessary for ensuring the safety of anything built on or around it, and it all depends on different factors the rock mass faces, such as the environmental conditions, size of the mass, and how discontinued it might be.

See also
 Engineering geology
 Geotechnical engineering
 Rock mass classification
 Slope stability analysis
 Rock mass plasticity
 SMR classification

References

 Coates, D F. (1981) "Rock Mechanics Principles." Canada: Monograph 874.

 
Petrology
Soil mechanics
Mining engineering